John Henry Long (November 27, 1845 – January 21, 1898) was an American politician in the state of Washington. He served in the Washington State Senate from 1889 to 1893.

References

1845 births
1898 deaths
Republican Party Washington (state) state senators